Hours of Work (Coal Mines) Convention (Revised), 1935 was  an International Labour Organization Convention that never came into force and was withdrawn.

It was established in 1935, with the preamble stating:
Having decided upon the adoption of certain proposals with regard to the partial revision of the Convention limiting hours of work in coal mines adopted by the Conference at its Fifteenth Session,,...

The convention did not come into force.

Modification 

The principles contained in the convention were a revision of ILO Convention C31, Hours of Work (Coal Mines) Convention, 1931.

Withdrawn
The convention was never brought into force, and was withdrawn at the ILO General Conference May 30, 2000.

Ratifications

External links 
Text.
Ratifications.

International Labour Organization conventions
Working time
Treaties concluded in 1935
Treaties not entered into force
History of coal mining
Mining treaties
1935 in labor relations